Villarroya may refer to:

The name of several places in Spain:

 Villarroya, La Rioja, a municipality in the province and autonomous community of La Rioja in northern Spain 
 Villarroya de los Pinares, a municipality in the province of Teruel, Aragon 
 Villarroya de la Sierra, a municipality in the province of Zaragoza, Aragon
 Villarroya del Campo, a municipality in the province of Zaragoza, Aragon

People:

 Francisco Villarroya (born 1966), retired Spanish footballer
 Miguel Ángel Villarroya Vilalta (born 1957), Spanish general